Lee Byung-joon (born January 27, 1964) is a South Korean actor. Active in film, television and theater since 1985, Lee is best known for his supporting roles in A Bloody Aria (2006), Highway Star (2007), and Eye for an Eye (2008). On TV, he appeared in the sitcoms Kokkiri (Elephant) (2008), Oh My God (2011) and Salamander Guru and The Shadows (2012), as well as the dramas Secret Garden (2010) and Dream High (2011).

Filmography

Film
The Eternal Empire (1995)
Sunset Into the Neon Lights (1995)
Mugoonghwa - Korean National Flower (1995)
Sympathy for Lady Vengeance (2005) 
A Bloody Aria (2006)
Dasepo Naughty Girls (2006)
Good Night (short film, 2007)
Highway Star (2007)
Eye for an Eye (2008)
City of Fathers (2009) (cameo)
Le Grand Chef 2: Kimchi Battle (2010)
Man of Vendetta (2010)
Earth Rep Rolling Stars (animated, 2011)
Perfect Game (2011) (cameo)
Never Ending Story (2012)
Love Fiction (2012)
The Suck Up Project: Mr. XXX-Kisser (2012)
A Millionaire on the Run (2012) (cameo)
Ghost Sweepers (2012) (cameo)
Born to Sing (2013) (cameo)
Mr. Perfect (2014)
My Dictator (2014)
Collective Invention (2015)
You Call It Passion (2015)

Television series

Variety show
Good Sunday - Diet Survival BIGsTORY (SBS, 2011)

Theater
Dreams of a Clown
Hanne
Fiddler on the Roof
Porgy and Bess
Blood Brothers
The Tale of Chunhyang
Urinetown
Chicago
A Midsummer Night's Dream
Oedipus the King
I Do! I Do! (2007)
Mine
New Scissors Family
200 Pounds Beauty (2011)

Teaching profession
Paekche Institute of the Arts: Adjunct professor
Sookmyung Women's University: Lecturer
Dankook University: Adjunct professor, School of Performing Arts
Korea Broadcasting Art School: Full-time faculty, Department of Broadcasting Entertainment and Acting

References

External links

Living people
1964 births
South Korean male film actors
South Korean male television actors
South Korean male stage actors
South Korean male musical theatre actors
20th-century South Korean male actors
21st-century South Korean male actors